Solo de Guitarra, Volumen No. 3 is an album by Argentine singer and guitarist Atahualpa Yupanqui. It was released in 1956 on the Odeon label.

Track listing
Side A
 "Canción del Carretero" (Gustavo Caraballo, Carlos López Buchardo)
 "El Aromo" (Romildo Risso - Atahualpa Yupanqui)
 "Zamba de mi Pago" (Hermanos Ábalos)
 "La Montaraza" (Atahualpa Yupanqui, Pablo del Cerro)

Side B
 "Huella, Huellita" (Atahualpa Yupanqui) 
 "La Zamba Soñadora" (Pablo del Cerro) 
 "Leña Verde" (Atahualpa Yupanqui) 
 "El Tulumbano" (Pablo del Cerro)

References

1956 albums
Atahualpa Yupanqui albums